Frunze may refer to:

Places
Bishkek, the capital of Kyrgyzstan; Frunze was the city's official name from 1926 to 1991
Frunze, Osh, a village in Nookat District, Osh Region, Kyrgyzstan
Frunze, Chuy, a village in Sokuluk District, Chuy Region, Kyrgyzstan
Frunze, Russia, several rural localities in Russia
Frunze, Tajikistan, a town in Sughd Province, Tajikistan
Frunze, former name of Hacırüstəmli, a village in Imishli District, Azerbaijan
Frunze, former name of Tuganbay, a village in Almaty Province, Kazakhstan
Frunze, former name of Kadamjay, a town in Batken Region, Kyrgyzstan
Frunze, former name of Sabriston, a town in Sughd Region, Tajikistan

People
Frunze Dovlatyan (1927–1997), Armenian film director and actor
Mikhail Frunze (1885–1925), Russian Bolshevik leader

Other
Frunze Airport, former name of the Manas International Airport, Kyrgyzstan
M.V. Frunze Naval School, former name of the St. Petersburg Naval Institute, Saint Petersburg
Soviet ship Frunze, several ships of the Soviet/Russian Navy named for Mikhail Frunze

See also
Frunzensky (disambiguation)
Imeni Frunze, several rural localities in Russia

Frunză (disambiguation), several places in Moldova
Frunzeni (disambiguation), several places in Romania